Alan Ramsay Hawley (July 29, 1864 – February 16, 1938) was one of the early aviators in the United States. In 1910, he won the national race with his balloon America II alongside his aide and life-long friend Augustus Post. Hawley was the first passenger to fly in an airplane from New York City to Washington, D.C., in May 1916. He was the president of the Aero Club of America from 1913 to 1918.

Biography 
He was born on 29 July 1869 in Perth Amboy, New Jersey, to Peter William Radcliffe Hawley (1829–1884) and Isabella Meritt (1838–1904). He attended the Trinity School in New York City before becoming a stockbroker with his brother, William Hawley, until he retired in 1912.

On January 1, 1907, he ascended with Major James C. McCoy in a  balloon Orient in St. Louis, Missouri.

He entered the 1910 Gordon Bennett International Balloon Race with Augustus Post and they left the grounds of the Aero Club of St. Louis at 5:45 p.m. on Monday, October 17, 1910, in their balloon America II. The balloon had been specially constructed in France for this race and was owned by Major James C. McCoy. During the flight they took watches of three hours each, "one sleeping and one watching the statiscopes, aneroid, and other instruments" (sic). A recording barograph (altimeter) kept a precise log of their altitude during the flight. They had been forced to land because of a storm. They were on a hillside at some  altitude and had traveled  from St. Louis. They had traveled at an average of 50 kilometres per hour (30 miles per hour). The next day they traveled south towards the last inhabited area they had passed over. Hawley was slowed by an ankle twisted just after landing. For the next three days they walked, sleeping under their blankets at night and eating a bare minimum of food. They eventually came upon a trapper's hut, at the edge of Lake St. John, which was not occupied at that moment. They rested there for a day, after which two French Canadian men out on a hunting trip arrived and agreed to help them. The trappers took them to Saint-Ambroise-de-Kildare, Quebec. Once there, they sent telegrams to family and the Aero Club to let them know they were alright. The message Hawley sent to his brother read: "Landed in wilderness week ago, fifty miles north of Chicoutimi. Both well —Alan." Their telegrams ended searches which had various parties had started, looking for them around the Great Lakes. Clifford B. Harman, a wealthy amateur aeronaut and aviator, had offered $1,000 to anyone who found Hawley and Post, dead or alive. On the evening before their telegrams were sent, Harmon had increased the reward to $7,000.

He died of coronary thrombosis on February 16, 1938, at age 73 at his home, 400 Park Avenue.

References

Further reading
 Flying, volume VII, number 11. December 1918. Published by Flying Association, New York.
 A Record Voyage in the Air by August Post. In Robert U. Johnson editor, The Century Magazine. Vol ??. Pages 451 to 470. Published by The Century Company, New York.
 City Of Flight: The History of Aviation in St. Louis by James J. Horgan. The Patrice Press. 
 Blue Ribbon Of The Air, The Gordon Bennett Races by Henry Serrano Villard. Smithsonian Institution Press.

External links
 History of air mail in the United States
 wdhawley.org – Website detailing the life and art of Alan's sister, Wilhelmina Douglas Hawley.

1869 births
1938 deaths
American aviation record holders
American aviators
American stockbrokers
Balloon flight record holders
Members of the Early Birds of Aviation
People from Perth Amboy, New Jersey
Trinity School (New York City) alumni